William R. Walker & Son was an American architectural firm in Providence, Rhode Island, active during the years 1881 to 1936. It included partners William Russell Walker (1830–1905), William Howard Walker (1856–1922) and later William Russell Walker II (1884–1936).

Firm history
William R. Walker began his architectural practice in 1864. Between 1876 and 1881 he partnered with Thomas J. Gould in Walker & Gould. In 1881, the two parted ways to start independent firms. Walker took his son W. Howard Walker into partnership to form the firm of William R. Walker & Son. William R. Walker died in 1905. W. Howard Walker died in 1922, at which point his son William R. Walker II took charge until his own death in 1936.

After the death of the last Walker, the firm was briefly succeeded by Rice & Arnold, the partnership of George H. Rice (1881-1945) and Roy F. Arnold (1884-1972), both draftsmen in the Walker office. Arnold continued to practice architecture in Providence and Pawtucket into the 1950s.

Throughout the firm's history, it was known for its educational buildings.  All of the Walkers had important political connections, enabling them to obtain the commissions for these and other civic structures.  The part of the Walker legacy that is most commonly passed over is their residential and commercial commissions.  Prominent commercial commissions include Providence's Lederer Building (1897), Attleboro's Bronson Building (1903), and the Washington Building (1921) in Providence.

Partner biographies

William Russell Walker
William R. Walker was born April 14, 1830, in Seekonk, Massachusetts. He established his architecture practice in 1864, and in 1876 formed the firm of Walker & Gould with Thomas J. Gould. In 1881 Walker formed a partnership with his son, W. Howard Walker, who remained his partner for the rest of his career.

Walker died March 11, 1905, in Pawtucket.

William Howard Walker
W. Howard Walker was born January 19, 1856, in Pawtucket, Rhode Island. He attended the public schools and joined his father's office as a draftsman in 1874, becoming his partner in 1881. After his father's death in 1905, he was sole proprietor in the firm until the return of his son from Europe. Like his father, he was an officer in the Rhode Island militia. He joined the American Institute of Architects in 1921.

In 1881 he was married to Hattie B. Hewell of Providence. He died October 19, 1922, in Seekonk, Massachusetts.

William Russell Walker II
William R. Walker II was born January 28, 1884, in Pawtucket. He attended the Pawtucket schools and Brown University before transferring to the Massachusetts Institute of Technology, from which he graduated in 1910. He then studied for a year abroad, travelling in Paris and Rome. In 1911 he returned to Providence, joining his father's firm. Upon his father's death in 1922, he became head of the firm. Like his father and grandfather, he continued the firm's focus on institutional work. In 1932 he was chosen by United States Commissioner of Education William John Cooper to be an advisory architect for school construction. He joined the American Institute of Architects alongside his father in 1921. Unlike his father and grandfather, he apparently had no affiliation with the state militia.

In 1914 he was married to Jessie Philpott of Providence, and they had three daughters. He died September 26, 1936, in Providence.

Architectural works

In Providence, Rhode Island 
 1881 - John E. Troup House, 477 Broadway, Providence, Rhode Island
 1882 - Elmwood Grammar School (former), 15 Vineyard St, Providence, Rhode Island
 1882 - George E. Boyden House, 20 Bainbridge Ave, Providence, Rhode Island
 1883 - Frank M. Mathewson House, 224 Bowen St, Providence, Rhode Island
 1883 - St. Theresa's R. C. Church, 265 Manton Ave, Providence, Rhode Island
 Demolished.
 1884 - Masonic Temple, 127 Dorrance St, Providence, Rhode Island
 Burned in 1896 and replaced by a building designed by Fred. E. Field.
 1885 - Benjamin F. Vaughan House, 148 Power St, Providence, Rhode Island
 Demolished.
 1885 - John McAuslan House, 544 Elmwood Ave., Providence, Rhode Island
 One of Providence's most fanciful dwellings. Demolished.
 1885 - Smith Street Primary School, 400 Smith St, Providence, Rhode Island
 1886 - Atwells Avenue Fire Station, 318 Atwells Ave, Providence, Rhode Island
 Demolished.
 1886 - Covell Street Primary School, 231 Amherst St, Providence, Rhode Island
 1887 - Christ Episcopal Church, 909 Eddy St, Providence, Rhode Island
 Demolished in 2006.
 1888 - Manton Avenue Grammar School, 917 Manton Ave, Manton, Rhode Island
 Demolished in 2002.
 1889 - Boston Store Annex, 140 Union St, Providence, Rhode Island
 1889 - Nicholas and Cyrus M. van Slyck Duplex, 4–6 Young Orchard Ave, Providence, Rhode Island
 Purchased by Bryant, and variously known as Gardner and Allan Halls. Demolished.
 1892 - Boston Store (Remodeling), 239 Westminster St, Providence, Rhode Island
 New facade and the addition of two stories.
 1893 - James E. Sullivan House, 254 Wayland Ave, Providence, Rhode Island
 1895 - St. Joseph's R. C. Hospital, 21 Peace St, Providence, Rhode Island
 Demolished.
 1896 - Lederer Building, 137 Mathewson St, Providence, Rhode Island
 1897 - Hotel Savoy, 135 Snow St, Providence, Rhode Island
 Demolished in 1994.
 1900 - Estelle R. Jackson Duplex, 121-123 Benevolent St, Providence, Rhode Island
 1900 - George W. Robertson House, 242 Adelaide Ave, Providence, Rhode Island
 1903 - Caesar Misch Building, 400 Westminster St, Providence, Rhode Island
 1903 - Cranston Street Armory, 125 Dexter St, Providence, Rhode Island
 1911 - Hanley Building, 56 Pine St, Providence, Rhode Island
 1913 - Armory of Mounted Commands, 1051 N Main St, Providence, Rhode Island
 The headhouse was built in 1923–1925 from plans by William G. Richards.
 1914 - Emery Theatre, 79 Mathewson St, Providence, Rhode Island
 Later the Carlton. Demolished in 1954.
 1914 - Gaiety Theatre, 220 Weybosset St, Providence, Rhode Island
 Demolished.
 1915 - Everett Apartments, 111 Everett Ave, Providence, Rhode Island
 1915 - Avon Cinema, 260 Thayer St, Providence, Rhode Island
 1916 - Emery's Majestic Theatre, 201 Washington St, Providence, Rhode Island
 Now home to the Trinity Repertory Company.
 1916 - Esek Hopkins School, 480 Charles St, Providence, Rhode Island
 1916 - Lederer Mausoleum, Congregation Sons of Israel and David Cemetery, 401 Reservoir Ave, Providence, Rhode Island
 A Doric temple built of Westerly granite.
 1916 - Modern Theatre, 440 Westminster St, Providence, Rhode Island
 Demolished in 1966.
 1916 - Hotel Dreyfus (Remodeling), 95 Mathewson St, Providence, Rhode Island
 1916 - Medical Building, 234 Thayer St, Providence, Rhode Island
 1917 - Vinton Building, 354 Westminster St, Providence, Rhode Island
 Demolished.
 1919 - Rialto Theatre (Remodeling), 121 Mathewson St, Providence, Rhode Island
 Added the Mathewson facade.  The auditorium was demolished in 1936.
 1919 - Watkins Building, 274 Pine St, Providence, Rhode Island
 Built for the D. W. Watkins Company.
 1921 - Hotel Berkshire Annex, 133 Mathewson St, Providence, Rhode Island
 Now part of the Hotel Providence.
 1921 - Washington Building, 93 Washington St, Providence, Rhode Island
 Demolished.
 1923 - Jewish Orphanage of Rhode Island, 164 Summit Ave, Providence, Rhode Island
 Remodeled in the 1950s to become Miriam Hospital. Barker & Turoff, architects of the remodeling.
 1924 - Rhode Island College of Pharmacy and Allied Sciences, 235 Benefit St, Providence, Rhode Island
 Now a RISD building.
 1926 - Henry Barnard School, Rhode Island College of Education, 199 Promenade St, Providence, Rhode Island
 Now the site of Providence Place.
 1934 - Gymnasium and Training School, 86 Mount Hope Ave, Rhode Island School for the Deaf, Providence, Rhode Island

Elsewhere in Providence County, Rhode Island 
 1881 - Ernest W. Tinkham House, 194 East Ave, Harrisville, Rhode Island
 1882 - John F. Clarke House, 91 Broad St, Valley Falls, Rhode Island
 1883 - Corliss Safe Manufacturing Works, 72 Fenner St, Cranston, Rhode Island
 Altered.
 1884 - First Freewill Baptist Church, 130 Broadway, Pawtucket, Rhode Island
 1884 - Park Place Congregational Church, 12 Park Pl, Pawtucket, Rhode Island
 Burned in 1934.
 1885 - Mauran Avenue School, 186 Mauran Ave, East Providence, Rhode Island
 Demolished.
 1885 - Middle Street School, 260 Middle St, Pawtucket, Rhode Island
 Demolished.
 1886 - 1st Ward Wardroom, 171 Fountain St, Pawtucket, Rhode Island
 1886 - 5th Ward Wardroom, 47 Mulberry St, Pawtucket, Rhode Island
 1888 - East Providence Town Hall, 145 Taunton Ave, East Providence, Rhode Island
 Burned in 1976.
 1888 - United Congregational Church, 75 N Broadway, East Providence, Rhode Island
 Altered in 1931 by Benjamin W. Wright.
 1888 - Williams Avenue School, 115 Williams Ave, East Providence, Rhode Island
 Heavily altered.
 1889 - Church Hill Grammar School, 81 Park Pl, Pawtucket, Rhode Island
 1889 - Edgewood School, 185 Norwood Ave, Cranston, Rhode Island
 Demolished.
 1889 - Lincoln High School (former), 580 Broad St, Central Falls, Rhode Island
 Built when Central Falls was a part of Lincoln. Now the City Hall.
 1890 - Grove Street School, 16-26 Grove St, Pawtucket, Rhode Island
 Demolished.
 1892 - Charles C. Newall House, 234 Norwood Ave, Cranston, Rhode Island
 1894 - Cumberland Town Hall, 45 Broad St, Valley Falls, Rhode Island
 1894 - Pawtucket Armory, 172 Exchange St, Pawtucket, Rhode Island
 1894 - Payne Building, 7 Goff Ave, Pawtucket, Rhode Island
 Demolished.
 1895 - Pawtucket High School (former), 300 Broadway, Pawtucket, Rhode Island
 1896 - St. Charles Borromeo R. C. School, 62 Daniels St, Woonsocket, Rhode Island
 Demolished.
 1896 - Woonsocket District Courthouse, 24 Front St, Woonsocket, Rhode Island
 1897 - Masonic Building, 55 High St, Pawtucket, Rhode Island
 Demolished.
 1900 - St. Joseph's R. C. Convent, 194 Walcott St, Pawtucket, Rhode Island
 Demolished.
 1901 - Social Street School, 706 Social St, Woonsocket, Rhode Island
 1902 - Harrisville School, 201 Callahan School St, Harrisville, Rhode Island
 Demolished.
 1904 - Clark Street School, 20 Clark St, Valley Falls, Rhode Island
 Demolished.
 1904 - South Woodlawn School, 54 Warren Ave, Pawtucket, Rhode Island
 Demolished.
 1908 - Prospect Street School, 329 Prospect St, Pawtucket, Rhode Island
 Demolished.
 1913 - Woonsocket Armory, 350 S Main St, Woonsocket, Rhode Island
 1914 - Central Falls Police Station and Courthouse (former), 507 Broad St, Central Falls, Rhode Island
 1919 - Clubhouse, Metacomet Country Club, 500 Veterans Memorial Pkwy, East Providence, Rhode Island
 1919 - Thornton School, 4 School St, Thornton, Rhode Island
 1920 - Fire Station No. 3, 1384 Cranston St, Cranston, Rhode Island
 1921 - North Smithfield Memorial Town Building, 1 Main St, Slatersville, Rhode Island
 Altered.
 1922 - Arthur E. Platt School, 80 Burnside Ave, Riverside, Rhode Island
 1924 - Park Theatre, 848 Park Ave, Cranston, Rhode Island
 1927 - Central Falls High School, 24 Summer St, Central Falls, Rhode Island
 1927 - Cranston High School, 899 Park Ave, Cranston, Rhode Island
 1927 - Fire Station No. 1, 131 Park Ave, Cranston, Rhode Island
 1927 - Masonic Temple, 2121 Smith St, Centerdale, Rhode Island
 1928 - Chester W. Barrows School, 9 Beachmont Ave, Cranston, Rhode Island
 1929 - East Providence Junior High School (former), 20 Whelden Ave, East Providence, Rhode Island
 Now known as the Taunton Plaza apartments.
 1929 - Frank C. Angell Memorial Town Hall, 2000 Smith St, Centerdale, Rhode Island
 1930 - Edward S. Rhodes School, 164 Shaw Ave, Cranston, Rhode Island
 1935 - Building for Disturbed Men, 16 Wilma Schesler Ln, Rhode Island Hospital for Mental Diseases, Howard, Rhode Island
 1935 - Building for Disturbed Women, 18 Wilma Schesler Ln, Rhode Island Hospital for Mental Diseases, Howard, Rhode Island

In Kent County, Rhode Island 
 1886 - District 4 School, 1515 W Shore Rd, Warwick, Rhode Island
 1893 - Warwick Town (City) Hall, 3275 Post Rd, Apponaug, Rhode Island
 1907 - Pontiac School, Greenwich Ave, Pontiac, Rhode Island
 Demolished.
 1908 - Kent County Courthouse (Remodeling), 125 Main St, East Greenwich, Rhode Island
 Presently the East Greenwich Town Hall.
 1912 - Kentish Artillery Armory, 3259 Post Rd, Apponaug, Rhode Island
 1915 - Phenix Trust Building, 704 Main St, Phenix, Rhode Island
 Demolished.
 1916 - Buttonwoods School (former), 3027 W Shore Rd, Buttonwoods, Rhode Island
 1916 - Cowesett School, 33 Division St, Cowesett, Rhode Island
 Near East Greenwich. Demolished.
 1916 - Spring Green School (former), 65 Shippen Ave, Spring Green, Rhode Island
 1920 - Apponaug School, 20 Centerville Rd, Apponaug, Rhode Island
 1921 - Miriam A. Duffy School, 10 Harris Ave, Arctic, Rhode Island
 1924 - Quidnick School, 191 MacArthur Blvd, Quidnick, Rhode Island
 1926 - West Warwick Junior High School (former), 124 Providence St, River Point, Rhode Island
 Now an elementary school.
 1931 - Oakland Beach School, 383 Oakland Beach Ave, Oakland Beach, Rhode Island
 A WPA project.
 1932 - Nelson W. Aldrich High School, 789 Post Rd, Warwick, Rhode Island
 A WPA project. Now a junior high school.

In Bristol County, Rhode Island 
 1882 - St. Mary's R. C. Church, 645 Main St, Warren, Rhode Island
 Demolished.
 1888 - George Hail Free Library, 530 Main St, Warren, Rhode Island
 1890 - Warren Town Hall, 514 Main St, Warren, Rhode Island
 Tower shortened after 1938.
 1891 - St. Matthew's Episcopal Church, 5 Chapel Rd, West Barrington, Rhode Island
 1896 - Walley School, 260 High St, Bristol, Rhode Island
 1900 - Oliver School, 151 State St, Bristol, Rhode Island
 1903 - Drownville School, Lincoln Ave & Walnut Rd, Drownville, Rhode Island
 Demolished.
 1919 - Maple Avenue School, 310 Maple Ave, Barrington, Rhode Island

In Washington County, Rhode Island 
 1901 - Westerly Armory, 8 Dixon St, Westerly, Rhode Island
 1904 - Ashaway School, 12 Hillside Ave, Ashaway, Rhode Island
 Altered.
 1907 - North Kingstown High School (former), 99 Phillips St, Wickford, Rhode Island
 1912 - Westerly Town Hall and Courthouse, 45 Broad St, Westerly, Rhode Island
 1925 - Doyle House, Exeter School, Exeter, Rhode Island
 Demolished.
 1927 - Higgins House, Exeter School, Exeter, Rhode Island
 Demolished in 2013.

In Massachusetts 
 1882 - First Universalist Church, 43 N Washington St, North Attleborough, Massachusetts
 Demolished.
 1884 - Goff Memorial Building, 124 Bay State Rd, Rehoboth, Massachusetts
 Burned in 1911.
 1885 - Centenary M. E. Church, 39 N Main St, Attleboro, Massachusetts
 Heavily altered.
 1885 - William H. Smith House, 185 S Main St, Attleboro, Massachusetts
 1886 - Fall River City Hall (rebuilding), 40 S Main St, Fall River, Massachusetts
 The building had been gutted by fire. Demolished in the 1960s.
 1888 - Mellen House, N Main & Franklin Sts, Fall River, Massachusetts
 Burned in 1943.
 1889 - Byron W. Anthony House, 527 Rock St, Fall River, Massachusetts
 1890 - Fall River National Bank Building, 59 N Main St, Fall River, Massachusetts
 1904 - Bronson Building, 8 N Main St, Attleboro, Massachusetts
 1910 - Attleboro Armory, 91 Pine St, Attleboro, Massachusetts
 1915 - Goff Memorial Building, 124 Bay State Rd, Rehoboth, Massachusetts
 1918 - Empire Theatre, 166 S Main St, Fall River, Massachusetts
 Demolished.
 1918 - Sanford Building, 1 Park St, Attleboro, Massachusetts
 1925 - First National Bank Building, 19 Park St, Attleboro, Massachusetts
 1932 - Smart Memorial Library (former), 536 Fall River Ave, Luther's Corner, Massachusetts
 1936 - Hiram Lake Chapel, Rehoboth Village Cemetery, Bay State Rd, Rehoboth, Massachusetts

In Connecticut 
 1883 - Ponemah Mill No. 2, 555 Norwich Ave, Taftville, Connecticut

In Maine 
 1905 - Narragansett Hotel, 149 Beach Ave, Kennebunk, Maine

Associated architects
Several architects were educated in the office of William R. Walker & Son, including:
 Albert H. Humes, Central Falls (1881–1887)
 Franklin R. Hindle, Providence (1892-1895)
 Thomas J. Hill Pierce, Providence (1912–1913)

Gallery

References

Defunct architecture firms based in Rhode Island
Design companies established in 1881
Design companies disestablished in 1938
Companies based in Providence, Rhode Island
1881 establishments in Rhode Island
1938 disestablishments in Rhode Island